Call Me When the Cross Turns Over is a 1957 novel by Australian author D'Arcy Niland. It was his second full-length novel, following The Shiralee.

Film Adaptation
Film rights were bought by Diane Cilento in 1962. A film version was announced in 1964 to be made in Australia by 20th Century Fox with Cilento and Sean Connery. In 1969 Peter Yates expressed interest in the movie. However no film resulted.

References

External links
Call Me When the Cross Turns Over at Austlit

1957 Australian novels
Angus & Robertson books